is the third compilation album by Japanese rock band Asian Kung-Fu Generation, released on February 26, 2014. The album consists of B-side tracks from previously released studio singles, recordings of live performances, tracks from previous Nano-Mugen Compilations and two new songs yet to be released on an album, "Rolling Stone" and "Slow Down". The limited edition two-disc DVD version includes live footage from the band's European and Asian tours in 2013.

Track listing

DVD
2013 European Tour
 "Blue Train" (ブルートレイン) (31 May 1013 at O2 Academy Islington, UK)
 "Re:Re:"(2 June 2013 at Le Bataclan, France）
 "Haruka Kanata" (遥か彼方) (3 June at Gloria, Germany)
TOKYO FM present EARTH×HEART PROJECT
ASIAN KUNG-FU GENERATION×STRAIGHTENER　－10th　Anniversary－ ASIA CIRCUIT
 "Solanin" (ソラニン) (17 December 2013 at UNIQLO AX, Korea)
 "Kimi to Iu Hana" (君という花) (20 December 2013 at SCAPE - The Ground Theatre, Singapore)
 "1980" (22 December 2013 at Legacy Taipei, Taiwan)

Personnel
Masafumi Gotō – lead vocals, guitar
Kensuke Kita – lead guitar, background vocals
Takahiro Yamada –  bass, background vocals
Kiyoshi Ijichi – drums
Asian Kung-Fu Generation – producer

References
CDJapan

Asian Kung-Fu Generation albums
2014 compilation albums
Japanese-language compilation albums
Sony Music compilation albums